Milorad Pavić (11 November 1921 – 16 August 2005) was a Serbian football player and coach.

Career
As a player, Pavić defended the colours of Red Star Belgrade. After his active career he became a head coach with the same team, winning the national championship three times (1958–59, 1959–60, 1963–64) and winning three Yugoslav Cups (1958, 1959, 1964). For seven seasons between 1957 and 1964, he led the team from the bench in 216 official competitive matches (113 wins, 52 draws, and 51 losses).

He also coached Belgian teams Club Brugge (1967–1969), Standard Liège (1964–1967, 1985–1986, 1987–1988), Portuguese teams Benfica (1974–1975) and Sporting CP (1978–1979), and Spanish teams Athletic Bilbao (1972–1974), CD Málaga (1975–1977) and Celta de Vigo (1980–1983). Outside Yugoslavia he was known by nickname "Michel". The press also described him as a Gentleman in Iron Gloves.

In his youth Pavić was taken hostage by the Germans in World War II.

Pavić also won two Belgian Cups as a coach with Standard Liege (1966, 1967), a Spanish Copa del Rey with Athletic Bilbao (1973), and a Portuguese league with Benfica in 1974–75.

Honours

Manager
Red Star Belgrade
Yugoslav First League: 1958–59, 1959–60, 1963–64
Yugoslav Cup: 1957–58, 1958–59, 1963–64
Standard Liège
Belgian Cup: 1965–66, 1966–67
Athletic Bilbao
Copa del Generalísimo: 1972–73
Benfica
Portuguese Championship: 1974–75
Celta Vigo
Segunda División: 1981–82

External links
 UEFA.com news 18-8-2005

1921 births
2005 deaths
Red Star Belgrade footballers
Yugoslav footballers
Serbian footballers
Yugoslav football managers
Serbian football managers
Serbian expatriate football managers
Red Star Belgrade managers
RFC Liège managers
FC Rouen managers
FK Vojvodina managers
La Liga managers
Athletic Bilbao managers
CD Málaga managers
RC Celta de Vigo managers
RCD Espanyol managers
S.L. Benfica managers
Sporting CP managers
Sportspeople from Valjevo
Expatriate football managers in Belgium
Expatriate football managers in France
Expatriate football managers in Portugal
Expatriate football managers in Spain
Standard Liège managers
Club Brugge KV head coaches
Association footballers not categorized by position